Alda Magyari (born 19 October 2000) is a Hungarian water polo goalkeeper.

At the 2020 Summer Olympics she competed for the Hungary women's national water polo team in the women's tournament.

She participated at the 2016 World Women's Youth Water Polo Championships, 2018 World Women's Youth Water Polo Championships, 2019 Water Polo World League, 2019 World Women's Junior Waterpolo Championships,  2019 World Aquatics Championships, 2020 Women's Water Polo World League.

References

External links
 
 Water Polo - Day 5: Baku 2015
 Alda MAGYARI furkisport
 WATER POLO-WORLD-WOMEN-2019-AUS-HUN

2000 births
Living people
Sportspeople from Budapest
Hungarian female water polo players
Water polo players at the 2020 Summer Olympics
Water polo goalkeepers
Medalists at the 2020 Summer Olympics
Olympic bronze medalists for Hungary in water polo
World Aquatics Championships medalists in water polo
21st-century Hungarian women